Popenaias popeii, common name the Texas hornshell, is a species of freshwater mussel, an aquatic bivalve mollusk in the family Unionidae, the river mussels.

This species is found in Mexico, and in Texas and New Mexico in the United States.

Diet and Feeding 
Following the parasitism of the glochidia larval stage, juvenile and adult Texas Hornshells consume algae, detritus, and bacteria through filter feeding[19,2]. They utilize their siphons to create a water current that pulls in possible food sources towards the gills, where food is then taken in and undesired particles are filtered out[19]. P. popeii may also use deposit-feeding methods to obtain food, such as using their muscular foot to attain edible particles from the river floor[19].

Parasitism and Predation 
There are currently no parasites known to specifically harm P. popeii, but they are parasitized by the organisms commonly known to feed off of Unionidae[2]. These include parasites such as trematodes and leeches[2]. Furthermore, the nymph of certain species of dragonfly was found to parasitize the gills of P. popeii, especially the brooding gills of females that house the glochidia larvae before release[3]. Diversity is seen in the predators of the Texas Hornshell, ranging from turtles to raccoons to birds[4]. Additionally, humans act as predators, using P. popeii for food or for making goods such as buttons[2].

Habitat 
Being part of the Unionidae, the Texas Hornshells are found in freshwater, specifically in rivers. To prevent from being carried downstream, P. popeii prefer habitats within the river where they can anchor to material like clay or sand[2]. They are often found under large rocks[5] and near areas where the current is least powerful[6]. Furthermore, their habitats must be within a certain range of salinity, as too high of a salinity concentration can lead to detrimental outcomes including death[7]. P. popeii inhabit areas where there are sufficient numbers of their host fish species for the glochidia larvae to attach to and parasitize[8]. They tend to live in the portions of the river where there are the fewest barriers that would prevent glochidia from finding suitable fish hosts upon release from the female brooding gills[8].

Life Cycle 
The Texas Hornshells do not experience direct development. They go through a developmental stage in which the larvae of P. popeii and the other freshwater mussels are referred to as glochidia[9]. These glochidia are small, often measured in micrometers, and have rows of conical denticles on the inside of each valve[10]. P. popeii glochidia are brooded in the gills of the female for about four to six weeks, classifying them as short-term brooders[10]. Following release of the glochidia from the female, the larvae become obligate parasites of freshwater fishes[9] and require a host within a few days[11]. Laboratory studies have shown that the glochidia can parasitize a wide variety of fishes, but in nature they are primarily found to parasitize three species[8]. These three species, C. carpio, M. congestum, and C. lutrensis, are parasitized by over 99% of P. popeii glochidia[8] and serve as the primary dispersal method for the freshwater mussel[9]. During the time attached to the fish host, the glochidia develop into juveniles[12]. Upon maturation the adult P. popeii are typically immobile and long-lived[6].

Distribution 
Currently, Popenaias popeii is endemic to only a few stretches of rivers in North America[7]. Individuals of the species can be found in the Black River in New Mexico[8] and in portions of the Rio Grande, which extends through New Mexico, Texas, and Mexico[7]. P. popeii scarcely populate the Black River, with living populations seen to only inhabit a 14-km stretch of the river[8]. The Rio Grande contains a greater number of river segments with P. popeii, including Pecos River, Devil’s River, and Las Moras Creek[13]. P. popeii and various other freshwater mussels were previously more abundant in areas of the Rio Grande[13], with 15 species living in the river system in the late 1990s[14]. Due to anthropogenic influence and other factors, the diversity of unionids has been reduced to approximately three species, including P. popeii[15]. Additionally, the population size and area inhabited by P. popeii has drastically decreased, leaving only a 190-km stretch of the Rio Grande that has a high abundance of P. popeii[13]. A portion of the river in Laredo, Texas has the largest population of P. popeii with an estimated 8000+ Texas Hornshells living there[5]. The current fragmentation of P. popeii populations is expected to persist due to predicted habitat and climate changes[9].

Conservation 
P. popeii is currently listed as endangered[16], joining many other freshwater mussel species that are a conservation concern[8]. The habitats of Texas Hornshells, desert aquatic ecosystems, are highly susceptible to the major causes of biodiversity reduction seen globally[17]. P. popeii are integral parts of the aquatic ecology where they are located[18], drawing support for their protection. Although the endangered classification of P. popeii is accompanied by federal protection, more conservation efforts are still being carried out to investigate key factors that may be useful in developing effective mitigation plans. The evolutionary differences among P. popeii populations caused by long-term fragmentation are being taken into account, meaning that conservation efforts in Black River and Rio Grande will be different and more individualized[9]. Anthropogenic effects are also of major concern, including water and land usage that accompany the increasing human population[9]. If not properly handled, it is predicted that distribution of P. popeii will not increase as potential habitats are altered or removed by human activity[9]. Other ecological factors such as river management[13], salinity[7], and primary host fish management[8] have similarly been found to influence persistence of P. popeii and thus serve as targets for mitigation.

References
2. Carman, S.M. 2007. Texas Hornshell Popenaias popeii Recovery Plan. New Mexico Department of Game and Fish, Conservation Services Division, Santa Fe, New Mexico.

3. Levine, Todd D., et al. “Parasitism of Mussel Gills by Dragonfly Nymphs.” The American Midland Naturalist, vol. 162, no. 1, 2009, p. 1.

4. Coker, R.E., A.F. Shira, H.W. Clark, and A.D. Howard. 1921. Natural history and propagation of fresh-water mussels. U.S. Bureau of Fisheries Bulletin 37:76-181.

5. Karatayev, A. Y., et al. “Long-Term Changes in Unionid Assemblages in the Rio Grande, One of the World’s Top 10 Rivers at Risk.” Aquatic Conservation: Marine and Freshwater Ecosystems, vol. 22, no. 2, pp. 206–219.

6. Delaune, Kelbi and M. Barnes. “eDNA detection of species of greatest conservation need in the Lower Pecos River System.” 2018.

7. Hart, Michael A., et al. “Salinity Tolerance of a Rare and Endangered Unionid Mussel, Popenaias Popeii (Texas Hornshell) and Its Implications for Conservation and Water Management.” Ecotoxicology & Environmental Safety, vol. 170, Apr. 2019, pp. 1–8.

8. Levine, T. D., et al. “Physiological and Ecological Hosts of Popenaias Popeii (Bivalvia: Unionidae): Laboratory Studies Identify More Hosts than Field Studies.” Freshwater Biology, vol. 57, no. 9, pp. 1854–1864.

9. Inoue, K., Lang, B.K. and Berg, D.J. (2015), Past climate change drives current genetic structure of an endangered freshwater mussel species. Molecular Ecology, 24: 1910-1926.

10. Smith, Douglas G., et al. “Gametogenetic Cycle, Reproductive Anatomy, and Larval Morphology of Popenaias Popeii (Unionoida) from the Black River, New Mexico.” The Southwestern Naturalist, vol. 48, no. 3, 2003, p. 333.

11. Haag, Wendell. (2013). The role of fecundity and reproductive effort in defining life history strategies of North American freshwater mussels. Biological reviews of the Cambridge Philosophical Society. 88.

12. M. Christopher Barnhart, et al. “Adaptations to Host Infection and Larval Parasitism in Unionoida.” Journal of the North American Benthological Society, vol. 27, no. 2, 2008, p. 370.

13. Karatayev, A. Y., et al. “Reconstructing Historical Range and Population Size of an Endangered Mollusc: Long-Term Decline of Popenaias Popeii in the Rio Grande, Texas.” Hydrobiologia, vol. 810, no. 1, pp. 333–349.

14. Johnson, R. I. (1999). Unionidae of the Rio Grande (Rio Bravo Del Norte) System of Texas and Mexico. Occasional Papers on Mollusks, 6(77), 1–66.

15. Burlakova LE, Karatayev AY, Karatayev VA, May ME, Bennett DL, Cook MJ. 2011. Biogeography and conservation of freshwater mussels (Bivalvia: Unionidae) in Texas: patterns of diversity and threats. Diversity and Distributions 17: 393–407.

16. https://ecos.fws.gov/ecp0/profile/speciesProfile.action?spcode=F02M

17. Inoue, K., Levine, T.D., Lang, B.K. and Berg, D.J. (2014), Long‐term mark‐and‐recapture study of a freshwater mussel reveals patterns of habitat use and an association between survival and river discharge. Freshwater Biology, 59: 1872-1883.

18. Vaughn, C. C. & C. C. Hakenkamp, 2001. The functional role of burrowing bivalves in freshwater ecosystems. Freshwater Biology 46: 1431–1446

19. http://www.wildlife.state.nm.us/download/education/conservation/wildlife-notes/aquatic/Texas-hornshell-mussel.pdf

Molluscs of Mexico
Molluscs of the United States
popeii
Bivalves described in 1857
Taxonomy articles created by Polbot
ESA endangered species